Gustavo Envela-Makongo Sr. (born in Spanish Guinea) was Equatorial Guinea's first ambassador to the United Nations. He resigned in 1970 due to dissent with government policy on free speech and human rights. With escalating political unrest Envela and his family fled into exile in the United States and settled in Salem, Oregon.

Recently deceased, Envela worked for the State of Oregon and helped raise his daughter and five sons. 

In the year 2000, one of his sons, Stanford University alumnus Gus Envela Jr., announced that he would run for president of Equatorial Guinea.

References

Year of birth missing
Equatoguinean exiles
Politicians from Salem, Oregon
African-American politicians
American people of Equatoguinean descent
Permanent Representatives of Equatorial Guinea to the United Nations
Equatoguinean diplomats
Year of death missing